District of Shelburne, officially named the Municipality of the District of Shelburne, is a district municipality comprising the eastern section of Shelburne County, Nova Scotia, Canada, but does not include the Towns of Shelburne or Lockeport. Statistics Canada classifies the district municipality as a municipal district. It is home to the Bowers Meadows Wilderness Area.

Demographics

Communities
The following communities are included within the Municipality of the District of Shelburne:

Access routes
Highways and numbered routes that run through the district municipality, including external routes that start or finish at the municipal boundary:

Highways

Trunk Routes

Collector Routes:

External Routes:
None

See also
 List of municipalities in Nova Scotia

References

External links 

Communities in Shelburne County, Nova Scotia
District municipalities in Nova Scotia